Thomas Butler (1748–1805) was a Continental Army officer from Pennsylvania during the American Revolution.  He was commissioned in the United States Army after the Revolution and rose to the rank of colonel.

Family
He was the brother of Major General Richard Butler and Captain Edward Butler.  All three brothers served in the American Revolution and in the Northwest Indian War against the Western Confederacy of Native American tribes in the Northwest Territories.  Two other brothers, William and Percival, served in the Revolution but did not see later military service.

American Revolutionary War 
Butler was commissioned a 1st lieutenant in the 2nd Pennsylvania Battalion on January 5, 1776 and was promoted to captain in the 3rd Pennsylvania on the 4th of October the same year.  He resigned from the Continental Army on January 17, 1781.

In 1783 he became an Original Member of the Pennsylvania Society of the Cincinnati.

Later military service
Butler was a major in the levies (i.e. militiamen conscripted for Federal service) under Major General Arthur St. Clair in the Northwest Territories in 1791.  He was wounded in action near Fort Recovery, Ohio, on November 4, 1791, in St. Clair's Defeat. His brother, Brigadier General Richard Butler, was killed in the same battle.

He was commissioned in the Regular Army on April 11, 1792 as a major in the Infantry and was assigned to the 4th Sublegion on September 4, 1792.  He was promoted to lieutenant colonel on July 1, 1794.  The 4th Sublegion was re-designated as the 4th Infantry Regiment on November 1, 1796.

Hairstyle controversy
On April 30, 1801, a General Order issued by Brigadier General James Wilkinson, Commanding General of the Army, abolished the queue as an acceptable military hairstyle, breaking the custom of a century. Butler applied for and was granted an exemption from the order. 

Within two years, however, the exemption was mysteriously revoked and Butler stood before a court martial which ended in a recommendation of reprimand. Butler was promoted to colonel of the 2nd Infantry Regiment on November 1, 1802 and was assigned to New Orleans, and was again ordered to cut his hair. He again refused and was again before a court martial. He was found guilty of mutinous conduct with a recommendation for a year's suspension.  Within days of the verdict, Butler was ill with yellow fever. 

On January 30, 1805 a petition was presented to the United States Senate signed by "sundry citizens and officers of the Militia of the State of Tennessee" asking that Colonel Butler be exonerated for failing to crop his hair, terming it "an illegal and arbitrary mandate".  The petition referred to Butler as a "worthy, aged and respectable officer" and was signed by 73 individuals, mostly military officers, lawyers and merchants.  The first signer of the petition was the commander of the Tennessee Militia, Major General Andrew Jackson.

Death and burial
Butler died of yellow fever on 7 September 1805, at Ormond Plantation, owned by his nephew, in St. Charles Parish, Territory of Orleans (today's Louisiana). 

He left the following instructions in his will: "Bore a hole through the bottom of my coffin, right under my head, and let my queue hang through it, that the damned old rascal will see that, even when dead, I refuse to obey his orders." His last wishes were obeyed. His obituary in the Carlisle Herald on November 1, 1805 read: "Now sleep the brave! who sink to rest; With all their country's wishes blest."

Colonel Butler is buried in the Ormond Plantation Cemetery in St. Charles Parish.

References

Historical Register of Officers of the Continental Army during the War of the Revolution. Francis B. Heitman. 1914.  pg. 138.

 American Revolution Institute

1748 births
1805 deaths
Continental Army officers from Pennsylvania
People of colonial Pennsylvania
Burials in Louisiana